The Oyster Bay Rear Range Lighthouse is located on the coast of Dar es salaam, Tanzania in Oyster Bay. The lighthouse works in conjunction with the Oyster Bay Range Front Lighthouse to warn ships away from the cliffs at the Msasani peninsula.

The tower is a red square stone tower with one red white strip on the range line. The lighthouse has a small red roofed building adjacent to the tower.

See also

List of lighthouses in Tanzania

References

External links 
 Photo of the Lighthouse
 Tanzania Ports Authority

Lighthouses in Tanzania
Buildings and structures in Dar es Salaam